The name Luis Pavez may refer to:
 Luis Pavez (footballer, born 1988) (born 1988), a Chilean midfielder, playing for Ñublense
 Luis Pavez (footballer, born 1995) (born 1995), a Chilean footballer, currently playing for Colo-Colo